This page provides general information about notable Linux distributions in the form of a categorized list. Distributions are organized into sections by the major distribution or package management system they are based on.

RPM-based

Red Hat Linux and SUSE Linux were the original major distributions that used the .rpm file format, which today is used in several package management systems. Both of these were later divided into commercial and community-supported distributions. Red Hat Linux was divided into a community-supported but Red Hat-sponsored distribution named Fedora, and a commercially supported distribution called Red Hat Enterprise Linux, whereas SUSE Linux was divided into openSUSE and SUSE Linux Enterprise.

Fedora-based

Fedora is a community supported distribution. It aims to provide the latest software while maintaining a completely Free Software system.

RHEL-based

Red Hat Enterprise Linux is a commercial open-source Linux distribution developed by Red Hat for the commercial market.

Other Fedora-based

openSUSE-based
openSUSE is a community-developed Linux distribution, sponsored by SUSE. It maintains a strict policy of ensuring all code in the standard installs will be from FOSS solutions, including Linux kernel Modules. SUSE's enterprise Linux products are all based on the codebase that comes out of the openSUSE project.

Mandriva-based
Mandriva Linux is open-source distribution (with exceptions), discontinued in 2011. The first release was named Mandrake Linux and based on Red Hat Linux (version 5.1) and KDE 1 in July 1998. It had since moved away from Red Hat's distribution and became a completely separate distribution. The name was changed to Mandriva, which included a number of original tools, mostly to ease system configuration. Mandriva Linux was the brainchild of Gaël Duval, who wanted to focus on ease of use for new users. The last stable version was in 2011. Mandriva's developers moved to Mageia and OpenMandriva.

Other RPM-based

Debian-based

Debian Linux is a distribution that emphasizes free software. It supports many hardware platforms. Debian and distributions based on it use the .deb package format and the dpkg package manager and its frontends (such as apt or synaptic).

Ubuntu-based

Ubuntu is a distribution based on Debian, designed to have regular releases, a consistent user experience and commercial support on both desktops and servers.

Current official derivatives 
These Ubuntu variants, also known as Ubuntu flavours, simply install a set of packages different from the original Ubuntu, but since they draw additional packages and updates from the same repositories as Ubuntu, all of the same software is available for each of them.

Discontinued official derivatives

Unofficial derivatives 
Unofficial variants and derivatives are not controlled or guided by Canonical Ltd. and generally have different goals in mind.

Knoppix-based

Knoppix, itself, is based on Debian. It is a live distribution, with automated hardware configuration and a wide choice of software, which is decompressed as it loads from the drive.

Other Debian-based

Pacman-based 
Pacman is a package manager that is capable of resolving dependencies and automatically downloading and installing all necessary packages. It is primarily developed and used by Arch Linux and its derivatives.

Arch Linux-based 
Arch Linux is an independently developed, x86-64 general-purpose Linux distribution that strives to provide the latest stable versions of most software by following a rolling-release model. The default installation is a minimal base system, configured by the user to only add what is purposely required.

Other Pacman-based

Gentoo-based

Gentoo is a distribution designed to have highly optimized and frequently updated software. Distributions based on Gentoo use the Portage package management system with emerge or one of the alternative package managers.

Slackware-based

Slackware is a highly customizable distribution that stresses ease of maintenance and reliability over cutting-edge software and automated tools. It is generally considered a distribution for advanced users.

Android-based 
Android is a mobile operating system bought and currently being developed by Google, based on a Google modified Linux kernel and designed primarily for touchscreen mobile devices such as smartphones and tablets.

Source-based

Other distributions 
The following distributions have not been categorized under the preceding sections.

Historical distributions

See also

 Comparison of Linux distributions
 Comparison of netbook-oriented Linux distributions
 DistroWatch
 Linux on PowerPC
 Linux on IBM Z
 List of live CDs
 List of router and firewall distributions

References

External links

 Linux free distros (Free Software Foundation)
 Repository tracking
 The LWN.net Linux Distribution List – Categorized list with information about each entry.
 Distrowatch – Announcements, information, links and popularity ranking for many Linux distributions.
 Linux Distros – Information and ISO files for many oldest Linux distributions.

 
Linux Distributions